Varahaneri is a neighbourhood in the Indian city of Tiruchirappalli. It is the birthplace of the Indian independence activist V. V. S. Aiyar. The Holy Redeemers Church is situated here.

References 

 

Neighbourhoods and suburbs of Tiruchirappalli